Penn Tarn is a mountain lake (tarn) located 0.1 nautical miles (0.2 km) north of Princeton Tarn in the southwest part of Tarn Valley, Victoria Land. The feature is one of four tarns in the valley named by the Victoria University of Wellington Antarctic Expedition (VUWAE), 1965–66, after American universities; Penn is a colloquial form of reference to the University of Pennsylvania.

See also
 Harvard Tarn
 Princeton Tarn
 Yale Tarn

University of Pennsylvania
Lakes of Victoria Land
Scott Coast